"Four Women" is a song written by jazz singer, composer, pianist and arranger Nina Simone, released on the 1966 album Wild Is the Wind. It tells the story of four African American women. Each of the four characters represents an African-American stereotype in society. Thulani Davis of The Village Voice called the song "an instantly accessible analysis of the damning legacy of slavery, that made iconographic the real women we knew and would become."

African-American female archetypes
The first of the four women described in the song is "Aunt Sarah" a character who represents African-American enslavement. Simone's description of the woman emphasizes the strong and resilient aspects of her race, "strong enough to take the pain" as well as the long-term suffering her race has had to endure, "inflicted again and again".
The second woman who appears in the song is dubbed "Saffronia", a woman of mixed race ("my skin is yellow") forced to live "between two worlds". She is portrayed as an oppressed woman and her story is once again used to highlight the suffering of the black race at the hands of white people in positions of power ("My father was rich and white/He forced my mother late one night").
The third woman is that of a prostitute referred to as "Sweet Thing". She finds acceptance with both black and white people, not only because "my hair is fine", but also because she provides sexual gratification ("Whose little girl am I?/Anyone who has money to buy").
The fourth and final woman is very tough, embittered by the generations of oppression and suffering endured by her people ("I'm awfully bitter these days/'cause my parents were slaves"). Simone finally unveils the woman's name after a dramatic finale during which she screams, "My name is Peaches!"

Style
Musically speaking the song is based on a simple groove based melody with piano, flute, electric guitar, and bass guitar accompaniment. The song gradually builds in intensity as it progresses, and reaches a climax during the fourth and final section. Simone's vocal becomes more impassioned, cracking with emotion and her steady piano playing becomes frenzied and at times dissonant, possibly to reflect the angst of the character. The song ends with Simone wailing, with ear splitting conviction, the name "Peaches".

Misinterpretation
Much to Simone's dismay, and despite her intention to highlight the injustice in society and the suffering of African-American people, some listeners interpreted the song as racist. They believed it drew on black stereotypes, and it was subsequently banned on several major radio stations.

Cover versions and uses in popular culture

The English blues rock band Black Cat Bones covered the song on their only album, Barbed Wire Sandwich, released in 1970.

The song was adapted by filmmaker Julie Dash into a 1978 short experimental film of the same name.

Sandra Bernhard performs the song in her one woman show, filmed in 1990 by John Boskovich and released as the film Without You I'm Nothing.

The group Reflection Eternal which is made up of rapper Talib Kweli and producer Hi-Tek has a version titled "For Women" on their 2000 debut album Train of Thought.

Berlin soul singer Joy Denalane, featuring Sara Tavares, Chiwoniso & Deborah, interpreted the song on her 2002 debut album Mamani.

A cover version of this song was featured in the ending credits of the 2010 movie For Colored Girls, featuring a sample of Nina Simone singing the 1st verse (as Aunt Sarah) with newly re-recorded vocals performed by Nina's daughter, Lisa Simone, singing Safronia's verse, Laura Izibor singing the role of Sweet Thing, and Ledisi singing Peaches' verse.

The song was on the 2010 show Black Girls Rock!. It is covered by R&B vocalists Kelly Price as Aunt Sarah, Marsha Ambrosius as Safronia, Jill Scott as Sweet Thing, and Ledisi as Peaches.

American experimental band Xiu Xiu covered "Four Women" on their 2013 Nina Simone tribute album Nina.

The song inspired the 2016 play Nina Simone: Four Women by Christina Ham. In the play, Nina meets the first three women (she is the fourth) at the site of the 16th Street Baptist Church bombing, and they become the characters in her song.

The song is sampled in the 2017 song "The Story of O.J." from rapper Jay-Z's thirteenth album 4:44, mixing many of the lyrics to create a background track. The song visits similar themes of injustice and suffering of African-American people in modern America.

Jamaican musician Queen Ifrica released a reggae version in 2021.

References

Nina Simone songs
1966 songs
American jazz songs
Obscenity controversies in music
Songs with feminist themes
Songs against racism and xenophobia
Songs written by Nina Simone